Harri Õunapuu (born 2 February 1947) is an Estonian agronomist and former politician. He served as Minister of Finance from 2002 to 2003. From 1989 until 1991, he was the Governor of Rapla County. He also served as Minister of Agriculture from 1991 to 1992.

Õunapuu was born in Sangaste Parish (now, part of Otepää Parish)  and graduated from Tartu 3rd Secondary School in 1961. In 1966, he graduated from the Räpina School of Horticulture with a degree in horticultural agronomy and from the Estonian Agricultural University in 1971 with a degree in agronomy.

References 

Living people
1947 births
Estonian agronomists
Agriculture ministers of Estonia
Finance ministers of Estonia
20th-century Estonian politicians
21st-century Estonian politicians
Estonian Centre Party politicians
Estonian Reform Party politicians
Members of the Riigikogu, 1999–2003
Members of the Riigikogu, 2003–2007
Members of the Riigikogu, 2007–2011
Estonian University of Life Sciences alumni
People from Otepää Parish